This is a list of active, dormant, and extinct volcanoes located beyond planet Earth. They may be designated mons (mountain), patera (an irregular crater) or tholus (small mountain or hill) in accordance with the International Astronomical Union's rules for planetary nomenclature. Many of them are nameless.

Io

Io, a moon of the planet Jupiter, is the most volcanically active body in the Solar System. Its volcanoes are believed to eject sulfur and sulfur dioxide, as well as basaltic and ultramafic silicate lavas.

Mars

Mars has many shield volcanoes, including the largest known volcano of the Solar System, but they are all dormant if not extinct.

Venus

On Venus, volcanic features are very numerous and quite diverse, but, like on Mars, none are known to be currently active. These volcanoes range from several to several hundred kilometers in diameter; a majority of them are shield volcanoes. In addition, Venus has unusual types of volcanoes: pancake domes and scalloped margin domes. Most small volcanoes on Venus are nameless.

The Moon

Due to the low viscosity of most lunar lava, volcanic mountains were seldom created. Instead, basaltic lava flooded large areas, which became lunar maria. Shield volcanoes are known from a few areas on the Moon; they are called lunar domes. Some areas of the Moon are covered with a usually dark coating, which is interpreted as pyroclastic deposits. Sometimes they form a dark halo around rilles. See also:
 Lunar dome
 Mons Rümker
 Mons Hansteen

Mercury

Many of Mercury's basins contain smooth plains, like the lunar mare, that are believed likely to be filled with lava flows. Collapse structures possibly indicative of volcanism have been found in some craters. Eleven volcanic domes were identified in Mariner 10 images, including a 1.4-km high dome near the centre of Odin Planitia.

Other planets and moons
 Saturn's moon Enceladus has geysers that spew water which have been photographed erupting by NASA's Cassini–Huygens spacecraft.
 Reports from NASA's Cassini–Huygens mission indicate that Saturn's moon Titan probably has volcanoes that eject water (cryovolcanoes).
 Triton, a moon of the planet Neptune, has noncryovolcanic geysers that are believed to eject nitrogen, dust, or methane compounds, as well as possible cryovolcanic features.
 Pluto has features that may be cryovolcanoes.

See also
Cryovolcano
:Category:Extraterrestrial mountains
Areography
 Lists of volcanoes

References

External links
 Extraterrestrial Volcanoes, Volcano World
 Solar System Volcanoes, Volcano Live

 Extraterrestrial